A goodwill ambassador is a professional occupation and/or authoritative designation assigned to a person who advocates for a specific cause or global issue on the basis of their notability such as a public figure, advocate or an authoritative expert.

Goodwill Ambassador, Goodwill Ambassadors, or Goodwill ambassadorship  may also refer to:

 FAO Goodwill Ambassador, official title of a goodwill ambassador advocating for the Food and Agricultural Organization
Goodwill ® Ambassadors, may refer to employees of any one of 10 or more used merchandise stores owned by Goodwill Industries
 UN Goodwill Ambassador, an official designation for celebrities named as United Nations Messengers of Peace
 UN Women Goodwill Ambassador, celebrity advocate for UN Women (UN Entity for Gender Equality and the Empowerment of Women)
 UNAIDS Goodwill Ambassador, political figures, celebrities, and subject matter experts from the Joint United Nations Programme on HIV/AIDS
 UNDP Goodwill Ambassador, prominent individual that serves as a goodwill ambassador to advocate the mission of the UNDP
 UNESCO Goodwill Ambassador, public figure that advocates for UNESCO
 UNFPA Goodwill Ambassador, celebrity advocate of the United Nations Population Fund mission
 UNHCR Goodwill Ambassador, celebrity advocate of the United Nations High Commissioner for Refugees' 
 UNICEF Goodwill Ambassador, local, regional and internationally known public figure that is selected to promote the mission of UNICEF
 UNIDO Goodwill Ambassador, public figure or expert that advocates for the United Nations Industrial Development Organization mission
 UNODC Goodwill Ambassador, celebrity advocate of the United Nations Office on Drugs and Crime
 WFP Goodwill Ambassador, expert or high-profile personality advocating for the World Food Programme
 WHO Goodwill Ambassador, a celebrity advocate of the World Health Organization